Gary M. Joraanstad (born c. 1946) is an American curler and 1987 United States men's champion.

Personal life 
His daughter is curler Nicole Joraanstad, multi-time United States women's champion and 2010 Olympian. At the time of the 1987 World Championship, he worked as a personnel supervisor. He is married and has two daughters. After living in Seattle, Joraanstad and his wife Debra moved to Heath, Ohio.

Teams

References

External links 
 
 National Champions | Granite Curling Club of Seattle

American male curlers
American curling champions
1940s births
Living people
People from Heath, Ohio
Sportspeople from Ohio
Sportspeople from Seattle